Benjamin Woodbury Cregor (January 31, 1898 - February 20, 1968) was a college football player and coach.

Early life 
Benjamin Woodbury Cregor was born on January 31, 1898. He served in the U. S. Army during World War I.

Playing career
Cregor was a prominent guard and tackle for the Centre Praying Colonels from 1918 to 1922, one of its "Seven Mustangs" on the line. He was selected All-Southern in 1921, the same year Centre beat Harvard.

Coaching career
Cregor coached the Louisville Cardinals football team from 1933 to 1935.

Later life 
Cregor died on February 29, 1968.

Head coaching record

References

1898 births
1968 deaths
American football guards
American football tackles
Centre Colonels football players
Louisville Cardinals football coaches
All-Southern college football players
People from Springfield, Kentucky
Players of American football from Kentucky